The 990s decade ran from January 1, 990, to December 31, 999.

Significant people
 Al-Qadir
 Mahmud of Ghazni
 Pope John XV
 Pope Gregory V

References